Brian Bonner (born September 22, 1959) is a former driver in the CART Championship Car series.

Bonner began his racing career on two wheels, racing motorcycles from 1975 to 1985. He attended a racing school at Lime Rock Park in 1986 and quickly saw success in Formula Ford competition. He then drove in the Firestone Firehawk Series and Barber Saab Pro Series. In 1990 and 1991 Bonner drove full-time in the IMSA GT Championship for Essex Racing in 1990 and Tom Milner Racing in 1991. He also made 3 starts in 1989 and 1990 in the American Racing Series.

In 1992 he moved to CART Champ Car and completed his rookie test at Sebring Raceway. He qualified for his first CART race, the 1992 Indianapolis 500 driving for Dale Coyne Racing in the 26th position but was knocked out by a crash after 97 laps.  His best CART finish came two weeks later and was 10th position at the 1992 Detroit Grand Prix driving for Foyt Enterprises. He made one other start in 1992 with Dale Coyne Racing (Mid-Ohio). he made his final start in 1993 with Hemelgarn Racing at the Cleveland Grand Prix after failing to qualify for the 1993 Indianapolis 500.

References

1959 births
Champ Car drivers
Indianapolis 500 drivers
Indy Lights drivers
Living people
Sportspeople from Boston
Racing drivers from Boston
Racing drivers from Massachusetts
Barber Pro Series drivers

Dale Coyne Racing drivers
A. J. Foyt Enterprises drivers